Maria Sharapova was the defending champion, but chose not to participate that year.

Seeds
The top four seeds receive a bye into the second round.

Draw

Finals

Top half

Bottom half

External links
Main & Qualifying Draw

Qatar Ladies Open - Singles
Qatar Ladies Open
2007 in Qatari sport